Dag Jostein Fjærvoll (20 January 1947 – 5 February 2021) was a Norwegian politician for the Christian Democratic Party. He served as Minister of Defence from 1997 to 1999, and Minister of Transport and Communications from 1999 to 2000.

His father Edmund Fjærvoll was also a member of Parliament.

He died sixteen days after his 74th birthday.

References

1947 births
2021 deaths
Members of the Storting
Christian Democratic Party (Norway) politicians
Ministers of Transport and Communications of Norway
20th-century Norwegian politicians
Defence ministers of Norway